Irina Wrona (born 1974 in Düsseldorf, Germany) is a German actress.

Filmography
 2016 Der Kriminalist – Die zwei Tode des Igor Dovgal, role: Letizia Marangiu
 2013 Herbstflattern (completed), role: Ulrike Gutmann
 2009 Romeo und Jutta (TV Movie), role: Braut Irina
 2009 Mondscheinsonate, role: Karen

References

External links 
 Irina Wrona; IMDb
 Irina Wrona; schauspielervideos.de

1974 births
Living people
German film actresses
Actors from Düsseldorf